Diti is a daughter of the Prajapati Daksha in Hinduism. She is a wife of the sage Kashyapa and the mother of the demonic race Daityas and the divine group of Marutas.

Legend 
According to the Puranic scriptures,
Diti is one of the sixty daughters of Prajapati Daksha and his wife Asikni. She and her twelve sisters were married to the sage Kashyapa. Diti is described as the mother of two groups of beings—the Daityas and the Maruts. The most prominent of her sons were Hiranyakashipu, Hiranyaksha, Vajranaka, Arunasura, Raktabija and Surapadman. Diti also had a daughter named Simhika (also known as Holika).

Birth of Hiranyaksha and Hiranyakashipu 
The Bhagavata Purana describes the circumstances of the birth of the two powerful daityas:

Birth of the maruts 
After the death of her sons in the Samudra Manthana, Diti grew inconsolable. She begged her husband to grant her a child who would be capable of defeating Indra. In due course, Diti became pregnant and following her husband’s advice, she engaged in worship and remained chaste. When Indra discovered that the child in Diti's womb was to be his slayer, he took on the disguise of an attendant. Indra used his thunderbolt known as the vajra to splinter the fetus into many pieces, from which originated the marutas.

Personality 
Diti is usually depicted as being cruel to both her husband Kashyapa, and her sister Aditi. She is obsessed with trying to bring the asuras into power. She is a bitter enemy of Aditi's sons, the devas, and she is instrumental in the asuras gaining control and autonomy over them.

See also
Aditi
Danu
Vinata

References 

Dictionary of Hindu Lore and Legend by Anna Dhallapiccola
TTD Publications.Go to this link to buy 'A Synopsis of Srimad Bhagavatam' for further details.

Hindu goddesses
Earth goddesses
Asura
 
Daughters of Daksha